CBH-FM is a Canadian radio station broadcasting in Halifax, Nova Scotia at 102.7 MHz. The station was launched on June 1, 1975 and is the CBC Music outlet for Nova Scotia, New Brunswick and Prince Edward Island. CBH-FM's studios are located on 7067 Chebucto Road in Halifax, while its transmitter is located on Washmill Lake Drive in Clayton Park.

CBH-FM originates one local program, Connections with Olga Milosevich. The program highlights upcoming cultural events in the Maritimes as well as a wide range of music from the region. This program is able to air primarily because of a gap on the national CBC Music schedule in Atlantic Canada, since some Saturday afternoon network programs are timed to air live in both the Atlantic and Eastern time zones. CBN-FM in St. John's, Newfoundland and Labrador is the only other station to air local programming of this type, however in that case the program is shared with the local CBC Radio One station, whereas Connections is exclusive to CBC Music.

Rebroadcasters
CBH-FM has rebroadcast transmitters in the following communities in Nova Scotia:

CBH-FM also has rebroadcast transmitters elsewhere in the Maritime Provinces:

External links
 CBC Nova Scotia
 
 

BH
BH
Radio stations established in 1976
1976 establishments in Nova Scotia